Bandhu Balaga is a 2008 Indian Kannada-language drama film  directed by Naganna and written by Janardhan Maharshi. The film stars Shiva Rajkumar and Poonam Kaur, Hema Chaudhary  along with Tejaswini Prakash, Shashi Kumar and Harish Raj in other pivotal roles. Parul Yadav, who played the role of sister in law of the hero, made her Kannada debut through this movie.

The film featured original score and soundtrack composed and written by Hamsalekha.

Plot 
The story surrounds the main character, Subramanya, an illegitimate son of a rich man. He lives with his sister in his village and spends most of his time doing good deeds for people who need help. However, he ends up in trouble when his father steps in to make matters confusing.

Cast 
 Shiva Rajkumar as Subramanya
 Poonam Kaur
 Hema Choudhary
 Shashikumar
 Srinivasa Murthy
 Doddanna
 Jyothirmayi
 Tejaswini Prakash as Annapoorna
 Harish Raj
 Parul Yadav
 Dharma
 Doddanna
 M. N. Lakshmi Devi
 Honnavalli Krishna
 Mandeep Roy

Soundtrack 
The music was composed by Hamsalekha to his own lyrics.

Reception 
A critic from Rediff.com wrote that "All in all, Bandhu Balaga is an enjoyable fare for the entire family".

References

External links 
 
 Sify Review

2008 films
2000s Kannada-language films
Films scored by Hamsalekha
Indian drama films
Films directed by Naganna
2008 drama films